The withdrawal of U.S. troops from Iraq may refer to:

 Gulf War § The end of active hostilities
 Withdrawal of U.S. troops from Iraq (2007–2011)
 Withdrawal of U.S. troops from Iraq (2020)